Crawljax is a free and open source web crawler for automatically crawling and analyzing dynamic Ajax-based Web applications. 

One major point of difference between Crawljax and other traditional web crawlers is that Crawljax is an event-driven dynamic crawler, capable of exploring JavaScript-based DOM state changes.
Crawljax can be used to crawl and create a static mirror of any Ajax web application.

References

External links 

Internet search engines